The Confusion Hill Bridges (aka. Confusion Hill Realignment, Confusion Hill Bypass or South Fork Eel River Bridges) are a pair of high bridges carrying two lanes of U.S. Route 101 over the South Fork Eel River in Mendocino County in the U.S. state of California. The north bridge was finished in July 2009 and the south bridge completed in September 2009; the whole bypass was officially opened to traffic in October of that year.

History
Prior to the realignment this slide would shift during heavy rains, causing damage to the roadway and delays to traffic.

The bridges were designed by the California Department of Transportation (Caltrans), and the contractors were MCM Construction Inc. and the Finley Engineering Group. The north bridge was begun on July 26, 2006 and it was completed in November 2008. Before the south bridge was finished, the north bridge was used to carry construction debris out of the realignment site on the opposite bank. The south bridge was begun in November 2006 and its two piers were completed by November 2008.

While the north bridge was opened in July 2009, the south bridge, which was also finished in July 2009, was opened in September 2009 and the Confusion Hill Realignment project was completed in October 2009. The total cost of this project is estimated at $67 million.

The bridges are collectively named after the nearby roadside attraction Confusion Hill. The two individual bridges were named after two pioneers, Elizabeth Jane Rosewarne and Mignon Stoddard Lilley.

Description

The site is located at a bend in the South Fork Eel River that takes it from a north-flowing course to turn east, north and west. The original path of Highway 101 follows the outside curve of this bend, while the realignment consists of two bridges, a north and south span, on opposite sides of the bend. The realigned portion of the roadway follows the bank of the South Fork opposite from the current bank the roadway follows. Both bridges are concrete beam bridges with two piers and three spans.

The north bridge has two slanted piers that are supported on the hills surrounding the river. It has two straight piers that support the side spans that extend out towards the center using cantilevers. The center span rests on these two cantilevers.

See also
 
 
 
 List of bridges in the United States by height

References

Bridges completed in 2008
Bridges completed in 2009
Bridges in Mendocino County, California
U.S. Route 101
Road bridges in California
Bridges of the United States Numbered Highway System
Cantilever bridges in the United States
Box girder bridges in the United States
Concrete bridges in California
Steel bridges in the United States